"In the Raw" is a 2007 single by Swedish glam metal band Crashdïet. This was the first single to feature the band's new lead singer H. Olliver Twisted on vocals, since their original singer Dave Lepard died in January 2006. This song appears as the opening track on the band's 2007 album, The Unattractive Revolution. The song debuted at #35 on the Swedish singles chart. The song's name and chorus is based on the album Live...In the Raw by the Heavy Metal band W.A.S.P which have been a major influence on the sound of Crashdïet.

Track listing
In the Raw
In the Raw (Instrumental version)

Personnel
H. Olliver Twisted - vocals
Martin Sweet - Guitar
Peter London - Bass guitar
Eric Young - drums

External links
Official Crashdiet website
In the Raw (Music video)

2007 singles
Songs written by Martin Sweet
Crashdïet songs
2007 songs
Universal Music Group singles